The 2000–01 Czech 2. Liga was the eighth season of the 2. česká fotbalová liga, the second tier of the Czech football league.

League standings

Top goalscorers

See also
 2000–01 Czech First League
 2000–01 Czech Cup

References

 Official website 
 RSSSF

Czech 2. Liga seasons
Czech
2000–01 in Czech football